Dragonfly is the second studio album by English band Strawbs. It contains the lengthy and rather progressive ballad "The Vision of the Lady of the Lake" describing the hardships of a boatman who encounters and battles a variety of mystical creatures on a lake, with a sword that was given to him by the lady of the lake. The album marked the first collaboration of Rick Wakeman with the band, though he only played on one song on this album, piano on The Vision of the Lady of the Lake; he eventually joined them on their next album, Just a Collection of Antiques and Curios, in 1970. Tony Visconti also played flute on two other songs.

Track listing

Personnel
Strawbs
Dave Cousins – Vocals, Acoustic guitar, Dulcimer, Chinese piano, Percussion
Tony Hooper – Vocals, Acoustic & Electric Guitars, Tambourine, Percussion 
Claire Deniz – Cello
Ron Chesterman – Double bass

Additional personnel 
Tony Visconti – Recorder on "Dragonfly and "Young Again"
Rick Wakeman – Piano on "The Vision of The Lady of the Lake"
Paul Brett – Lead guitar on "The Vision of The Lady of the Lake"
Bjarne Rostvold – Drums on "The Vision of The Lady of the Lake"

Recording

Recorded at Rosenberg Lydteknik, Copenhagen with additional work at Morgan Studios, London.
Mixed at Trident Studios, London

Tony Visconti – Producer, engineer, Percussive effects
Roger Quested – Engineer
Roger Saunders - Design, Illustrations

Release history

References

Dragonfly on Strawbsweb
Sleeve notes AMS 970 Dragonfly
Sleeve notes 5302680 Dragonfly

Strawbs albums
1970 albums
Albums produced by Tony Visconti
A&M Records albums
Albums recorded at Morgan Sound Studios